The Museum of Archaeology (Russian: Музей Археологии Казахстана, tr. muzei arheologii kazakhstana) is an archaeological museum, part of the National Academy of Sciences of Kazakhstan, located in the  complex in Almaty, Kazakhstan.

History 
The creation of the museum is connected with the work of several generations of Kazak scientists beginning in the 1920s, and the development of Kazak archeological science. Longstanding research by Kazakh scientists across the country resulted in the discovery of rich and often unique material from the ancient and medieval history of Kazakhstan. The museum opened in 1973 at the initiative of the First Secretary of the Communist Party of Kazakhstan Dinmukhamed Kunaev.

In 2012, the museum reopened after restoration, as part of the  complex at a new location, the building of the Academy of Sciences of Kazakhstan.

Exhibition
In 1946 Alkey Margulan became the organizer and the head of the Central Kazakhstan archaeological expedition, which discovered the largest deposits of finds from the late Bronze Age Begazy-Dandybai culture in Kazakhstan. Findings of this expedition became the main part of the display during the opening of the museum in 1973.

The Museum of Archaeology continues to work on acquiring artefacts, accepting findings of archaeologists from across the country. The museum developed a scientific exhibition, covering the ancient history of Kazakhstan from the Stone Age to the Middle Ages. Of particular value is the reconstruction of the burial chamber of mound number 11 of the Altai Berel.

References 

Museums in Almaty
Museums established in 1973
Archaeological museums